Petrašiūnai is a village in Jonava district municipality, in Kaunas County, central Lithuania. According to the 2011 census, the town has a population of 102.

References

Villages in Jonava District Municipality